William Gilbert Wilson (23 January 1918 – 21 June 1999) was Bishop of Kilmore, Elphin and Ardagh from  1981 to 1993.

Educated at Belfast Royal Academy and Trinity College, Dublin and  ordained in 1942, his first posts were curacies at St Mary Magdalene, Belfast and St Comgall's, Bangor. Following these he was Rector of Armoy and then Dean of Connor (1976–1981) before appointment to the episcopate as the fourteenth bishop diocesan of the united Diocese.

He served as editor of The Church of Ireland Gazette from 1963 to 1966.

References

1918 births
1999 deaths
People educated at the Belfast Royal Academy
Alumni of Trinity College Dublin
20th-century Anglican bishops in Ireland
Bishops of Kilmore, Elphin and Ardagh
Deans of Connor